The Kuwait Open was a table tennis tournament held annually in Kuwait by the International Table Tennis Federation (ITTF). It featured regularly on the ITTF World Tour calendar from 2006 to 2016.

History

The tournament was first held in 2006, and has featured on the ITTF World Tour's schedule every year since then, with the exception of 2011 when the country was temporarily suspended due to a recommendation from the International Olympic Committee.

China's Ma Long holds the record for most men's singles tournament wins, with three, while Liu Shiwen and Li Xiaoxia of China jointly hold the record for most women's singles tournament wins, with two each.

In August 2016, Kuwait was not included on the 2017 World Tour schedule announced by the ITTF.

Champions

See also
Asian Table Tennis Union

References

External links
International Table Tennis Federation

ITTF World Tour
Table tennis competitions